Vice-regent may refer to:

a person who acts for a regent
a synonym of viceroy
a common misuse of vicegerent